Ferruh Güpgüp (1891, Kayseri – 18 April 1951) was a Turkish politician.

She had private education and knew Arabic. She was a member of Kayseri CHP Administrative Council and City Council. She was a representative of Kayseri in the Turkish parliament and one of the first women to be elected as a parliament member.

References

1891 births
1951 deaths
Republican People's Party (Turkey) politicians
20th-century Turkish women politicians